Mokerang may be,

Mokerang language
Mokerang Airfield, former WW2 airfield on the northwest tip of Los Negros Island
Mokerang Village, village on northwest part of Los Negros Island
Mokerang Peninsula, peninsula of Los Negros Island